Salvador Gonzáles Escalona, born October 21, 1948,in Camagüey, Cuba, and died 16 of april 2021 in Havana, Cuba , was a Cuban painter, muralist and sculptor. His artist name is Salvador.

His work is known as an "afro-cuban" style. He describes his work as a mix of surrealism, cubism and abstract art.

Salvador has no formal art education, but as early as in 1968 he had his first art exhibition "Arte Popular Cubano" in "Museo de Artes Decorativas", Havana.

In the 1980s he had a series of art exhibitions at Cuba. In 1986 he had an exhibition at Seychelles and in 1987 an exhibition in Rome, Italy.

Callejón de Hamel

April 21, 1990 Escalona started with murals and sculptures in the alleyway Callejón de Hamel, near University of Havana. For sculptures he used scrap objects like bathtubs, hand pumps, pin wheels etc., and for the murals he used different kind of available paint, including car enamel.

Even though the first four years became difficult, he was inspired by local inhabitants and visitors to continue his work, and little by little, the street was transformed from a slum area to an enthusiastic Afro-Cuban centre.

Today there are workshops for young Cuban children to learn painting. Every Sunday there are rumba performances, and every Friday Cuban music in the street.

This is still Salvador's artistic headquarter.

Later exhibitions
From 1990 he is represented at various exhibitions at Cuba. From 1992 he had several exhibitions abroad:

Norway
1992 - Stavanger + Bergen (University of Bergen) + Florø

Denmark
1992 - Århus + Copenhagen
1994 - Randers
1996 - Vejle

Mexico
1994 -

Puerto Rico
1997 - San Juan

United States
1998 - New York City (The Metropolitan Pavilion Gallery) + University of California, Los Angeles
1999 - New York (Manhattan)
2000 - New York (The Metropolitan Pavilion Gallery) + Tiberino + Philadelphia

Spain
2005 - Madrid

Murals
Besides several murals at Cuba, he has done murals abroad:

Venezuela
1991 - "El Hijo del Sol", 350 m2 - Hotel Caracas Hilton

Norway
1992 - Florø

Mexico
1993 - "Ancestros" - Centro Multicultural, Xochimilco. Invited by Dr. Fèlix Zurita Ochoa
1994 - "Sol de America" - Museo Antropologico de Querétaro, Institudo Indigenista Otomi, Universidad Autonomica

Denmark
1995 - "Madre Agua", "Solidaritetshuset", Copenhagen
1996 - "Deidales del Mar" - Vejle

United States
1995 - "La Roca del Amor" - The Johnson State College, Vermont + a mural in Arizona
1996 - "El muerto pare el Santo" + "Iku Lobi Osha" - California + "La creacion de Obbatala ante el dios del Camino" - New Jersey (Roosevelt elementary school) + "El dios del Camino" - New York (Washington Square Preschool)
1998 - "El framboyan" - New York (El Museo del Barrio)
2000 - "Mariposas del Caribe" - Philadelphia
2001 - "Una Flor para Africa" - Philadelphia

St. Martin
1996 - Hospitality center, Alburquerque

Puerto Rico
1998 - "Orilla frente al Mar" + "Rumba" + "Rumba en la Rumba" + "De un solo pajaro las dos alas"

Italy
2007 - Torino

Sculptures
Besides several sculptures at Cuba:

Denmark
1994 - "La ganga y la Llave" - Randers
1996 - "Yemaya Olokun" - Vejle

Movies
Several video-interviews is produced by Cuban TV and by others. 2002 the 79 minutes documentary "A Cuban Legend: The Story of Salvador González" was produced by Bette Wanderman.

Presentations
The New York Times - Presentation of the movie «A Cuban Legend».

Videos
Havana-Cultura Presentation og interview

Cuban painters
Modern painters
1948 births
Living people
20th-century Cuban sculptors
20th-century Cuban male artists